Centro Limoeirense de Futebol is a Brazilian football soccer club, founded in 1913, on Limoeiro city (Pernambuco State). The club became professional in 1963 to be eligible to compete in the Campeonato Pernambucano. Centro Limoeirense competed in the Campeonato Brasileiro Série C in 1997.

Current squad (some players)

Honours
Pernambuco Championship 2nd level runner-up: 1995 and 2000

Appearances in competitions

 Campeonato Pernambucano: 1963, 1964, 1996, 1997, 2001, 2008
 Campeonato Brasileiro Série C: 1997

Association football clubs established in 1913
Football clubs in Pernambuco
1913 establishments in Brazil